Federico Peluso (born 20 January 1984) is an Italian professional football coach and former player who is a technical assistant for  club Monza. He played as a left back for various Serie A clubs and the Italy national team.

Club career
Peluso began his youth career at Petriana, in Rome. He later moved to Lazio, but was subsequently released.

In 2001, he joined Pro Vercelli, where he played three full seasons. In 2004 summer he joined Ternana, and after two years in the club, he was bought from AlbinoLeffe, being promoted with the Bergamo club. However, in his second season, he had a fallout with the club's ownership, and was removed from squad. In January 2009, Peluso joined Atalanta, as an exchange for Karamoko Cissé.

On 8 March 2009, Peluso made his Serie A debut, playing against AC Milan. On 25 October, he made his first top flight goal, against Parma.

On 3 January 2013, Peluso joined Juventus on a six-month loan, with a view to a permanent transfer after the period. He spent the second half of the 2012–13 campaign on loan with the Bianconeri, and his performances earned him a permanent transfer and a contract until June 2017, as Juventus captured the league title. In June 2013, Juventus announced that they had completed the signing of Federico Peluso from Atalanta for a transfer fee of €4.8 million. After the end of the 2013–14 season, Serie A side Sassuolo announced that they acquired Peluso outright, as part of the deal that brought Luca Marrone back to Juventus.

International career
On 10 August 2012, after his impressive performances on Atalanta, Peluso (alongside teammates Andrea Consigli, Manolo Gabbiadini and Ezequiel Schelotto) was called from manager Cesare Prandelli to the Italian national squad. Five days later, he made his debut, in a friendly loss against England. On 11 September, he scored his first international goal, in a 2–0 home win in a World Cup qualifier against Malta.

Managerial career
On 17 October 2022, Peluso was appointed technical assistant of newly-promoted Serie A side Monza.

Career statistics

Club

1Includes Coppa Italia and Coppa Italia Serie C.
2Includes UEFA Champions League.

International

As of match played 11 September 2012. Scores and results list Italy's goal tally first.

Honours
Atalanta
 Serie B: 2010–11

Juventus
 Serie A: 2012–13, 2013–14
 Supercoppa Italiana: 2013

References

External links
 Atalanta B.C. Official Player Profile 
 Lega Serie A Player Profile 
 FIGC Player Profile 
 
 

Living people
1984 births
Footballers from Rome
Italian footballers
Association football fullbacks
F.C. Pro Vercelli 1892 players
Ternana Calcio players
U.C. AlbinoLeffe players
Atalanta B.C. players
Juventus F.C. players
U.S. Sassuolo Calcio players
Lega Pro Seconda Divisione players
Serie B players
Serie A players
Italy international footballers
Association football coaches